The Mission Valley League is a high school athletic league that is part of the CIF Southern Section. Member schools are all in the west side of the San Gabriel Valley region of Los Angeles County It was created in 1972 with eight schools: El Monte, Arroyo, Rosemead, Mt. View, Schurr, San Gabriel, Keppel, and Monrovia.

Current members
 Arroyo High School (El Monte, California) - 1972
 El Monte High School - 1972
 Gabrielino High School (San Gabriel, California) - 1996
 Marshall Fundamental Secondary School (Pasadena, California) - 2014
 Mountain View High School (El Monte, California) - 1972
 Rosemead High School - 1972
 South El Monte High School - 1992

Former members
 Cerritos High School (1994 - 1998)
 Duarte High School (1972 - 1992)
 Mark Keppel High School (Alhambra, California) (1972 - 1992)
 Monrovia High School (1972 - 1982)
 San Gabriel High School (1972 - 1982)
 Schurr High School (Montebello, California) (1972 - 1982)

References

CIF Southern Section leagues